MEG may refer to:

 Mono-Ethylene glycol, an alternative name ethylene glycol, organic compound ethane-1,2-diol
 Madras Engineer Group, regiment of the Corps of Engineers of the Indian Army
 Maghreb-Europe Gas Pipeline, a natural gas pipeline linking Africa and Europe
 Magnetoencephalography, mapping brain activity by recording magnetic fields produced by currents in the brain
 Malange Airport, by IATA code, airport in Malanje, Angola
 Media General, by NYSE stock symbol, defunct American media company
 Melody Garden stop, by MTR station code, a light rail stop in Tuen Mun, Hong Kong
 Midland Examining Group, former exam board in England, Wales and Northern Ireland
 Motionless electromagnetic generator, purported perpetual motion machine
 The Mu to E Gamma experiment, a particle physics experiment in muon decay
 Multiple exciton generation, a concept in quantum electronics
 Musée d'ethnographie de Genève, an ethnographic museum in Geneva (Switzerland)
 Museum Ethnographers Group, a collective of ethnographic researchers
 Meg (singer), a living Japanese singer, songwriter and model

See also 

 Meg (disambiguation)
 Meg, for people with the name
 

ja:メグ